Kevin Bernard Hamilton Jr. (born May 2, 1984) is an American retired professional basketball player. In college, Hamilton was an honorable mention All-American and the 2005 Patriot League Player of the Year as a junior at Holy Cross.

College
Hamilton played for the Holy Cross Crusaders from 2002 to 2006. During his four-year career, the team were two-team Patriot League regular season champions (2003, 2005) and one-time Patriot League tournament champions (2003). A 6'4" point guard, Hamilton averaged 12.2 points, 4.7 rebounds, 2.5 assists, and 2.4 steals per game for his career. He earned second-team All-Patriot League honors as a sophomore, then repeated as a first-team selection in his junior and senior years. As a junior in 2004–05, Hamilton led the Crusaders to a regular season championship behind averages of 15.7 points, 5.7 rebounds, 2.8 assists, and 2.9 steals per game. He was named the Patriot League Player of the Year and earned national recognition as an Associated Press honorable mention All-American. The following season (his final year), Hamilton did not repeat as the conference player of the year but he did win the Patriot League Defensive Player of the Year award. He also ranked fifth in NCAA Division steals per game as a senior. In his final two seasons, Hamilton led the Patriot League in both scoring and steals. Hamilton's 292 career steals were both Holy Cross and Patriot League records at the time of his graduation.

In 2013, Holy Cross inducted Hamilton into their athletics hall of fame. In 2015, the Patriot League named him to their 25th Anniversary Team, celebrating the best 25 players in league history to that point.

Professional
After going undrafted in the 2006 NBA draft, Hamilton embarked on a 10-year international professional career. He played for clubs in Poland, Puerto Rico, Germany, and France. His most successful season as a pro came in 2008–09, when he was named a Polish League All-Star and his team won the Polish Cup.

References

External links
 College statistics @ sports-reference.com
 "Born with a basketball in his hands" Gearan, John. Holy Cross Magazine (January 2006)

1984 births
Living people
American expatriate basketball people in France
American expatriate basketball people in Germany
American expatriate basketball people in Poland
American men's basketball players
Archbishop Molloy High School alumni
Baloncesto Superior Nacional players
Basketball Löwen Braunschweig players
Basketball players from New York City
Besançon BCD players
Cangrejeros de Santurce basketball players
Holy Cross Crusaders men's basketball players
Indios de Mayagüez basketball players
KK Świecie players
Medi Bayreuth players
Point guards
Rouen Métropole Basket players
SKK Kotwica Kołobrzeg players
Sportspeople from Queens, New York